Office space may refer to:

An office
Office space planning
Office Space, a 1999 film